Underbelly is an Australian television true crime-drama series which first aired on the Nine Network between 13 February 2008 and 1 September 2013, before being revived on 3 April 2022. Each series is based on real-life events. There have been six full series, with season 7 being a miniseries. A 2014 series titled Fat Tony & Co is a sequel to the first series but is not branded under the Underbelly title.

Synopsis 
The first series is based on the book Leadbelly: Inside Australia's Underworld, by journalists John Silvester and Andrew Rule. The series also borrows the title 'Underbelly' from a previously successful series of 12 true crime compilations by the same authors. Three direct tie-in novels, based on the first three seasons, were also later published by the same authors as part of this series, and a separate 16th book (Underbelly: The Golden Casket) was published in 2010. The fourth series is based on the book Razor by crime author Larry Writer, which was subsequently republished as a tie-in. A fifth tie-in novel, by Andy Muir, was published for the final series. Despite being part of the Underbelly series, the first 12 books have never been republished with the famous Underbelly logo, and the logo was only used from books 13 to 18 (including Golden Casket and the republishing of Razor).

The fifth series, Underbelly: Badness, is based on Sydney underworld figure Anthony "Rooster" Perish, his brother Andrew and their associates. It is set between 2001–2012, and broadcast from 13 August 2012. This is the only season that did not receive a 'tie-in' novel.

A sixth series titled Underbelly: Squizzy, based on the events surrounding Joseph "Squizzy" Taylor and set between 1915 and 1927, began airing on 28 July 2013.

Three telemovies called The Underbelly Files aired in 2011. Tell Them Lucifer was Here is about the 1998 murders of Victorian police officers Gary Silk and Rod Miller and the subsequent manhunt for their killers. Infiltration is about the story of Australian police detective Colin McLaren's infiltration of the Calabrian Mafia in Griffith, New South Wales which saw dozens of underworld figures imprisoned The Man Who Got Away tells the story of David McMillian, a drug smuggler and the only Western man to ever escape from Bangkok's Klong Prem Central Prison. All three aired on the Nine Network in February 2011.

In September 2011, a New Zealand version of the series premiered on TV3, titled Underbelly NZ: Land of the Long Green Cloud. The six-part mini-series was the first Underbelly production to be produced and financed outside of Australia. The series detailed events beginning in the late 1960s to and throughout the 1970s and told the origin of the Mr Asia drug syndicate and its original leader Marty Johnstone. The series is somewhat a prequel to the series A Tale of Two Cities. An American version has also been announced on the network channel Starz though nothing else has been confirmed.

Seasons

Underbelly (2008) 

Season 1 focuses on events in Melbourne which occurred between 1995 and 2004, referred to in the press as the Melbourne gangland killings, in which 36 criminal figures and others were killed, and the transformation of Carl Williams from harmless driver into one of Australia's most notorious drug kingpins.

Underbelly: A Tale of Two Cities (2009) 

Season 2 is a prequel to the first series and focuses on events that occurred in Sydney and Melbourne between the years 1976 to 1987.
It was about Griffith, NSW, the cannabis capital of Australia.

Underbelly: The Golden Mile (2010) 

Season 3 is the sequel to A Tale of Two Cities - and hence the prequel to the first series - and focuses on events that stemmed from the Kings Cross nightclub scene in Sydney between the years 1988 to 1996

Underbelly: Razor (2011) 

Season 4 is set in Sydney during the roaring 1920s, when organised crime in Australia began. It's the story of the bloody battle between the era's most feared vice queens, Tilly Devine and her rival Kate Leigh. The series is based on the Ned Kelly Award-winning book Razor, by Larry Writer. The series includes an ensemble cast including actresses Chelsie Preston Crayford and Danielle Cormack portraying Devine and Leigh respectively.

Underbelly: Badness (2012) 

Season 5 is set in modern-day Sydney between 2001–2012 and tells the story of underworld figure Anthony "Rooster" Perish and the efforts of the NSW Police Force's Strike Force Tuno to bring him to justice. The cast includes Jonathan LaPaglia as Anthony Perish, Jodi Gordon, Matt Nable, Josh Quong Tart, Aaron Jeffrey, Jason Montgomery, Hollie Andrew and Leeanna Walsman.

Underbelly: Squizzy (2013) 

Season 6 occurs between 1915–1927 in Melbourne and tells the story of one of the city's most notorious criminals, Squizzy Taylor, who made an appearance in Underbelly: Razor, which was set in 1920s Sydney. Justin Rosniak did not reprise his role as Squizzy as Jared Daperis took over the role.

Underbelly: Vanishing Act (2022) 

Season 7 tells the story of the bizarre disappearance of Melissa Caddick, the high-roller who allegedly embezzled over $40 million before disappearing while under investigation. It is a two part mini-series which is part factual and part fictional.

Underbelly: Files telemovies 
In early 2010 the Nine Network announced that three separate stand-alone crime telemovies would continue the Underbelly franchise. Known by the collective title Underbelly: Files, the first was Tell Them Lucifer was Here, the second Infiltration and the third The Man Who Got Away. They premiered on Australia's Nine Network early in the 2011 ratings season. A fourth telemovie Chopper followed in 2018.

Underbelly Files: Tell Them Lucifer Was Here

Tell Them Lucifer Was Here depicts the 1998 murders of Victorian police officers Gary Silk and Rod Miller. It shows the enormous efforts of the Lorimer Task Force in leading the manhunt for their killer or killers.

It stars Brett Climo, Jeremy Kewley, Todd Lasance, Greg Stone, Dimitri Baveas, Ditch Davey, Jane Allsop, Annie Jones, Paul O'Brien, Daniel Whyte, Chris Bunworth, James Taylor, Craig Blumeris, Jasmine Dare, Marshall Napier, Robert Taylor, Shanti Pezet and Lee Cormie, with a return guest appearance by Don Hany as Nik 'The Russian' Radev - the same character he played in the original Underbelly series (which was set a few years after the events that take place in this movie).

The movie had its premiere screening across Australia on the Nine and WIN Networks on Monday 7 February 2011, followed by an encore screening on GEM on Sunday 13 February 2011.

Late in 2010 this telemovie hit a legal snag as part of a pending court case in the NSW law courts, which resulted in a slightly altered version of Lucifer being broadcast in Sydney and NSW on Monday 7 February. The version screened in NSW omitted one particular scene and changed the names of a number of individuals in the case (for example "Bandali Debs" changed to "Patrici Fabro"); however, in an oversight, the subtitles were not edited and showed the original names. When the DVD of the Underbelly Files telemovies were released, Tell Them Lucifer Was Here was omitted from the release in NSW only. Like the first series of Underbelly in Victoria, releases of the DVD that contained Tell Them Lucifer Was Here had a warning sticker banning the exhibition of the telemovie in NSW.

Underbelly Files: Infiltration

Infiltration is an adaptation for screen from an autobiographical novel written by ex-cop Colin McLaren. He and his police partner lived undercover in Griffith, New South Wales for a number of years, in order to infiltrate the very closed and deadly Mafia community there. For days, weeks, then months and years, Colin eats with them, sits in their homes and cuddles their kids, all the while climbing the N'Drangheta, finally befriending the Griffith Godfather, Antonio Romeo.

The two-hour telemovie aired on 14 February 2011 and stars Sullivan Stapleton as Colin McLaren, Jessica Napier as Jude, Tottie Goldsmith as Sara, Kassandra Clementi as Chelsea McLaren, and co-stars Valentino del Toro, Buddy Dannoun, Glenda Linscott and Henry Nixon.

Underbelly Files: The Man Who Got Away

The Man Who Got Away tells the story of David McMillan who was a British born Australian drug smuggler and the only westerner in history to escape from Klong Prem prison in Bangkok.

It stars Toby Schmitz David McMillan and Claire van der Boom as McMillan's partner Clelia Vigano. The cast also features Jeremy Sims, Aaron Jeffery, Nicholas Eadie, Brendan Cowell, Freya Stafford, Josh Lawson, John Orcisk, William Zappa, Heather Mitchell and Deidre Rubenstein. It also features Anthony Tsingas as David's father.

The Man Who Got Away premiered on the Nine Network on Monday 21 February 2011.

Underbelly Files: Chopper (2018) 

Chopper is based on Australia's most notorious gangster, Mark "Chopper" Read, in the 1970s, 80s and 90s.

Chopper premiered on the Nine Network on Monday February 12, 2018, and concluded on Tuesday February 13, 2018.

Cast and characters 

 Underbelly
 Rodger Corser as Detective Senior Sergeant Steve Owen
 Caroline Craig as Senior Detective Jacqui James
 Gyton Grantley as Carl Williams
 Kat Stewart as Roberta Williams
 Vince Colosimo as Alphonse Gangitano
 Robert Rabiah as P.K 
 Les Hill as Jason Moran
 Martin Sacks as Mario Condello
 Simon Westaway as Mick Gatto

 Underbelly: A Tale of Two Cities
 Roy Billing as Robert Trimbole
 Anna Hutchison as Allison Dine
 Matthew Newton as Terry Clark
 Asher Keddie as Detective Senior Constable Liz Cruickshank
 Peter Phelps as Detective Inspector Joe Messina

 Underbelly: The Golden Mile
 Emma Booth as Kim Hollingsworth
 Firass Dirani as John Ibrahim
 Wil Traval as Joe Dooley
 Cheree Cassidy as Debbie Webb
 Dieter Brummer as Trevor Haken
 Paul Tassone as Dennis Kelly
 Daniel Roberts as Jim Egan
 Damien Garvey as Graham "Chook" Fowler

 Underbelly: Razor
 Danielle Cormack as Kate Leigh
 Chelsie Preston Crayford as Tilly Devine
 Anna McGahan as Nellie Cameron
 Jack Campbell as "Big Jim" Devine
 John Batchelor as Wally Tomlinson
 Khan Chittenden as Frank "The Little Gunman" Green
 Richard Brancatisano as Guido Calletti
 Craig Hall as Detective Inspector Bill Mackay
 Lucy Wigmore as Lillian May Armfield
 Steve Le Marquand as Sergeant Tom Wickham

 Underbelly: Badness
 Matt Nable as Detective Sergeant Gary Jubelin
 Jonathan LaPaglia as Anthony "Rooster" Perish
 Ben Winspear as Detective Sergeant Tim Browne
 Josh Quong Tart as Andrew "Undies" Perish
 Jason Montgomery as Brett "Decker" Simpson
 Ella Scott Lynch as Senior Constable Camille Alavoine
 Justin Smith as Matthew "Muzz" Lawton
 Aaron Jeffery as Frank "Tink" O'Rourke

 Underbelly: Squizzy
Jacob Francis Worrall as 'Lil Nicky' Smith
 Jared Daperis as Squizzy Taylor
 Camille Keenan as Dolly Grey
 Susie Porter as Rosie Taylor
 Ashley Zukerman as Detective James Bruce
 Luke Ford as Albert "Tankbuster" McDonald
 Dan Wyllie as Detective Frederick Piggott
 Ken Radley as Detective John Brophy
 Nathan Page as Henry Stokes
 Diana Glenn as Annie Stokes
 Matt Boesenberg as John "Snowy" Cutmore
 Andrew Ryan as Angus "Gus" Murray
 Richard Cawthorne as "Long Harry" Slater

Viewership

International versions and sequel series

Fat Tony & Co. 

The series Fat Tony & Co. was confirmed on 3 August 2013, and production for the series began on 5 August 2013. Based on Tony Mokbel, the series covered the manhunt for Mokbel that lasted 18 months and dismantled a drug empire and was also filmed in Greece. The series saw the return of Robert Mammone as Mokbel, Vince Colosimo as Alphonse Gangitano, Gyton Grantley as Carl Williams, Les Hill as Jason Moran, Madeleine West as Danielle McGuire, Simon Westaway as Mick Gatto, Gerard Kennedy as Graham Kinniburgh and Kevin Harrington as Lewis Moran.

Informer 3838 

Informer 3838 is a television series focusing on criminal barrister-turned police informer Nicola Gobbo (code name informer 3838) and her involvement in the Melbourne gangland killings. Commissioned by the Nine Network and produced by Screentime, it aired in late April, 2020. It follows Nicola Gobbo from her days studying law at Melbourne University in the mid-1990s, up to the very end of the deadly gangland war in 2010 following Carl Williams' death in Barwon Prison and the aftermath. Informer 3838 gives a new insight to the relationships Gobbo made in the criminal underworld with figures like Carl Williams and Tony Mokbel. The return of these characters to the Underbelly franchise also means the return of Gyton Grantley performing his previous role of Williams. Robert Mammone also resumes his casting as Mokbel. Jane Harber also returns as a policewoman this time to Underbelly, previously portraying Detective Steve Owen's partner in the first season. Rhys Muldoon plays ecstasy dealer and family man Terrence Hodson.

American version 
On 22 June 2010, it was announced that the channel Starz would remake the Underbelly series. It would not be based on the original series, but instead the writers would look for American gangs and rewrite situations in Underbelly: A Tale of Two Cities, replacing character traits and outcomes.

New Zealand version 

This six-part mini-series aired on TV3 in New Zealand from 17 August to 21 September 2011. Underbelly NZ: Land of the Long Green Cloud is set in New Zealand between 1972 and 1980. Events depicted include the origins of the Mr. Asia drug syndicate and its original leader, Marty Johnstone. Though not a part of the Australian series chronology, this series is partly a prequel and partly runs concurrently with events in Underbelly: A Tale of Two Cities. Main characters include Marty Johnstone, Andy Maher and Detective Constable Ben Charlton.

Home video releases 

Underbelly DVD Releases:

Blu-ray

DVD box sets

Underbelly (TV Seasons) DVDs

Video game 
In October 2012, Underbelly: Skirmish, the first Underbelly game, was released on the iTunes app store. The game is available for iPhones and iPads. An Android version was in production with a release date scheduled prior to December 2012. The game has a "cops vs robbers" gameplay mechanic, with the player able to choose between playing as a cop, or as a member of the Rough Company.

The game was produced by Underbellys producers, Screentime, and transmedia production company, The Project Factory, with development by Epiphany Games.

Notes

References

External links

 
 

2000s Australian television miniseries
2008 Australian television series debuts
2010s Australian television miniseries
2013 Australian television series endings
2000s Australian crime television series
2000s Australian drama television series
English-language television shows
Nine Network original programming
Television series by Screentime
Television shows set in New South Wales
Television shows set in Victoria (Australia)
True crime television series
Television series about organized crime
Works about organised crime in Australia
2010s Australian crime television series
2010s Australian drama television series